Hans Hach Verdugo and Austin Krajicek were the defending champions but only Hach Verdugo chose to defend his title, partnering Miguel Ángel Reyes-Varela. Hach Verdugo lost in the semifinals to André Göransson and Ben McLachlan.

Göransson and McLachlan won the title after defeating Luis David Martínez and Cristian Rodríguez 6–3, 6–4 in the final.

Seeds

Draw

References

External links
 Main draw

Monterrey Challenger - Doubles